Hirsch Barenblat (born 1914, date of death unknown) was a Polish-born Israeli musician and conductor, known for his role as head of the Jewish Ghetto Police in the Będzin Ghetto and subsequent legal cases in Poland and Israel which ended with his acquittal by the Israeli Supreme Court in 1963.

See also 
Kapo

Sources
Avihu Ronen, Hadas Agmon & Asaf Danziger (2011) "Collaborator or Would-Be Rescuer? The Barenblat Trial and the Image of a Judenrat Member in 1960s Israel" Yad Vashem Studies 

1914 births
Year of death missing
20th-century Polish Jews
Israeli conductors (music)
Jewish Ghetto Police
People from Będzin
Polish conductors (music)
Polish emigrants to Israel